Ritwik Kumar Das (born 14 December 1996) is an Indian professional footballer who plays as a winger for Indian Super League club Jamshedpur.

Club career

Early years 
Ritwik gave his first trial at a Mohun Bagan non-residential academy when he was in ninth grade where he learnt the nuances of football.

He began his professional journey with Calcutta Customs in the CFL First Division before switching to Kalighat MS in 2016 where they played in the Calcutta Premier Division Group B.

Ritwik's time of reckoning arrived when Real Kashmir FC decided to hold trials at a Sports Authority of India ground in West Bengal in 2017. After impressing the club management, he signed a contract and represented them in the 2017–18 I-League 2nd Division.

Real Kashmir 
He made his I-League debut for Real Kashmir on 11 December 2018 at EMS Stadium against Shillong Lajong, he was brought in as substitute in 77th minute as they won 6-1. He evolved as a highly rated winger at the club.

Kerala Blasters 
On 15 July 2020, RitwikDas joined Indian Super League club Kerala Blasters. He made his debut on 20 November against ATK Mohun Bagan in the season opener. He played 4 matches throughout campaign and left the club at the end of the season.

Jamshedpur 
On 21 October 2021, Ritwik Das joined Jamshedpur on a one-year deal, with an option to extend for another year. On 26 November, he made his debut as a substitute for Seiminlen Doungel in a 1–3 away league win over Goa. On 17 February 2022, he scored his first ever Indian Super League goal against Mumbai City. He scored 4 goals from 17 appearances and won the 2021–22 Indian Super League League Winners Shield with the club.

Career statistics

Honours 
Jamshedpur
Indian Super League League Winners Shield: 2021–22

References

1996 births
Living people
People from Asansol
Indian footballers
Real Kashmir FC players
I-League players
Footballers from West Bengal
Kerala Blasters FC players
Association football midfielders
Jamshedpur FC players